Kiki's Delivery Service may refer to:

 Kiki's Delivery Service (novel), the original novel and its sequels
 Kiki's Delivery Service (musical),  musical adaptations of the book and the anime film
 Kiki's Delivery Service, an anime film adaptation directed by Hayao Miyazaki
 Kiki's Delivery Service (manga), a manga made through the use of the anime production stills
 Kiki's Delivery Service (2014 film), a live-action adaptation of the first two novels